Nusrat Jahan Choudhury (born 1976) is a Bangladeshi American lawyer and nominee to serve as a United States district judge of the United States District Court for the Eastern District of New York.

Education 

Choudhury earned a Bachelor of Arts from Columbia University in 1998, a Master of Public Administration from the Princeton School of Public and International Affairs in 2006, and a Juris Doctor from Yale Law School in 2006.

Career 

Choudhury began her career as a law clerk for Judge Denise Cote of the United States District Court for the Southern District of New York and Judge Barrington Daniels Parker Jr. of the United States Court of Appeals for the Second Circuit. She worked for more than 11 years at the national ACLU based in New York City. She has since worked as a staff attorney for the ACLU National Security Project and Racial Justice Program. Since 2020, she has been the legal director of the American Civil Liberties Union of Illinois.

Nomination to district court 
On January 19, 2022, President Joe Biden nominated Choudhury to serve as a United States district judge of the United States District Court for the Eastern District of New York. President Biden nominated Choudhury to the seat vacated by Judge Joseph F. Bianco, who was elevated to the United States Court of Appeals for the Second Circuit on May 17, 2019. 

On April 27, 2022, a hearing on her nomination was held before the Senate Judiciary Committee. During her confirmation hearing, she was asked whether she had said "the killing of unarmed Black men by police happens every day in America." Choudhury at first testified she was not sure she made that statement but then said she "said it in my role as an advocate." Her testimony caused several law enforcement groups, including the Fraternal Order of Police and the Sergeants Benevolent Association, to oppose her nomination. Two weeks after her hearing, Choudhury sent a letter to the Judiciary Committee denying that she had made the statement. Republicans on the Judiciary Committee requested a second hearing due to Choudhury's contradictory statements, but Senator Dick Durbin rejected the request for a second hearing.  On May 26, 2022, her nomination was reported out of the committee by a 12–10 vote. On January 3, 2023, her nomination was returned to the President under Rule XXXI, Paragraph 6 of the United States Senate; she was renominated later the same day. On February 9, 2023, her nomination was reported out of committee by an 11–10 vote. Her nomination is pending before the United States Senate.

If confirmed by the Senate, Choudhury would become the first Muslim woman and first Bangladeshi American to serve as a federal judge.

Personal life 

Choudhury married Michael Early, a visual effects producer, in 2016.

See also 
 Joe Biden judicial appointment controversies

References 

1976 births
Living people
21st-century American women lawyers
21st-century American lawyers
American people of Bangladeshi descent
Columbia University alumni
Illinois lawyers
Lawyers from Chicago
New York (state) lawyers
Princeton University alumni
Yale Law School alumni